"U 2 Luv" is a song by American singer-songwriters Ne-Yo and Jeremih. It was released on May 29, 2020. The song interpolates elements of two classic 1980s hits – Mtume's "Juicy Fruit" and Zapp's "Computer Love". On October 23, 2020, an official remix was released, featuring rapper Lil Durk and singer Queen Naija.

The song peaked at number 66 on the Billboard Hot 100, marking Ne-Yo's first appearance on the charts since 2014's "Time of Our Lives". Eventually, the song was included on his eighth studio album, Self Explanatory (2022).

Background
Ne-Yo described the song on Instagram, referencing the COVID-19 quarantine: "My friend Jeremih and I have created the perfect soundtrack for you and quarantine bae".

Music video
The video was uploaded on August 8, 2020, directed by Chad Tennies and Caleb Seales. The visual follows Ne-Yo and his wife, Crystal Renay, as they take to the floor of a closed roller skating rink – with a cameo from comedian Jess Hilarious – while Jeremih and his girlfriend enjoy a cozy night at home.

Charts

References

2020 singles
2020 songs
Ne-Yo songs
Jeremih songs
Songs written by Ne-Yo
Songs written by Jeremih
Songs written by James Mtume
Songs written by Larry Troutman
Songs written by Shirley Murdock